Adams Glacier, also known as John Quincy Adams Glacier, is a broad channel glacier in Wilkes Land, Antarctica which is over  long. It debouches into the head of Vincennes Bay, just east of Hatch Islands. It was first mapped in 1955 by G.D. Blodgett from aerial photographs taken by U.S. Navy Operation Highjump (1947), and it was named by the Advisory Committee on Antarctic Names (US-ACAN) for John Quincy Adams, sixth President of the United States. Adams was instrumental while later serving as U.S. representative from Massachusetts in gaining congressional authorization of the United States Exploring Expedition (1838–42) under Lieutenant Charles Wilkes, and perpetuating the compilation and publication of the large number of scientific reports based on the work of this expedition.

See also
 List of glaciers in the Antarctic
 Glaciology

Glaciers of Wilkes Land